Buzzard is the common name of several species of birds of prey.

Buteo species
 Archer's buzzard (Buteo archeri)
 Augur buzzard (Buteo augur)
 Broad-winged hawk (Buteo platypterus)
 Common buzzard (Buteo buteo)
 Eastern buzzard (Buteo japonicus)
 Ferruginous hawk (Buteo regalis)
 Forest buzzard (Buteo trizonatus)
 Galápagos hawk (Buteo galapagoensis)
 Grey hawk (Buteo plagiatus)
 Grey-lined hawk (Buteo nitidus)
 Hawaiian hawk (Buteo solitarius)
 Jackal buzzard (Buteo rufofuscus)
 Long-legged buzzard (Buteo rufinus)
 Madagascar buzzard (Buteo brachypterus)
 Mountain buzzard (Buteo oreophilus)
 Puna hawk (Buteo poecilochrous)
 Red-backed hawk (Buteo polyosoma)
 Red-necked buzzard (Buteo auguralis)
 Red-shouldered hawk (Buteo lineatus)
 Red-tailed hawk (Buteo jamaicensis)
 Ridgway's hawk (Buteo ridgwayi)
 Roadside hawk (Buteo magnirostris)
 Rough-legged buzzard (Buteo lagopus)
 Rufous-tailed hawk (Buteo ventralis)
 Short-tailed hawk (Buteo brachyurus)
 Swainson's hawk (Buteo swainsoni)
 Upland buzzard (Buteo hemilasius)
 White-rumped hawk (Buteo leucorrhous)
 White-tailed hawk (Buteo albicaudatus)
 White-throated hawk (Buteo albigula)
 Zone-tailed hawk (Buteo albonotatus)

Other species
 Black-breasted buzzard (Hamirostra melanosternon)
 Black-chested buzzard-eagle (Geranoaetus melanoleucus)
 Grasshopper buzzard (Butastur rufipennis)
 Grey-faced buzzard (Butastur indicus)
 Honey-buzzards, genus Pernis and Henicopernis, superficially resembling Buteo buzzards are specialist feeders on wasp nests and larvae
 Barred honey buzzard (Pernis celebensis)
 Black honey buzzard (Henicopernis infuscatus)
 Crested honey buzzard (Pernis ptilorhynchus)
 European honey buzzard (Pernis apivorus)
 Long-tailed honey buzzard (Henicopernis longicauda)
 Lizard buzzard (Kaupifalco monogrammicus)
 Rufous-winged buzzard (Butastur liventer)
 White-eyed buzzard (Butastur teesa)
 In parts of the US, the turkey vulture (Cathartes aura) is colloquially called a "buzzard".

Bird common names
Birds of prey
Falconry
Vultures